Emil (Emmanuel) Veniaminovich Braginsky (19 November 1921 – 26 May 1998) was a Soviet/Russian screenwriter and an Honored Art Worker of the RSFSR (1976) and Winner of USSR State Prize (1977).

He appeared as an actor in the 1995 TV film Vorovka.

Biography 
Braginsky was born in Moscow on 19 November 1921. In 1953 he graduated from Kutafin Moscow State Law University

As a scriptwriter, he made his debut in the 1955 film  Squared 45. From 1963 onward, Braginsky worked in a creative collaboration with Eldar Ryazanov. Their first joint work was the 1966 comedy film Beware of the Car.

Filmography
Squared 45 (1956)
Vasily Surikov (1959)
Absolutely Seriously (1961) (segment Istoriya s pirozhkami)
Beware of the Car (1966)
Malenkiy beglets (1966)
When Rain And Wind Knock At The Window (1968)
Zigzag udachi (1968)
Stariki-razboyniki (1971)
Uchitel peniya (1972)
Chelovek s drugoy storony (1972)
Unbelievable Adventures of Italians in Russia (1974)
Shag navstrechu (1975)
The Irony of Fate (1975)
Office Romance (1977)
Pochti smeshnaya istoriya (1977)
Suyeta suyet (1978)
The Garage (1979)
Station for Two (1982)
Nezhdanno-negadanno (1983)
Poyezdki na starom avtomobile (1985)
Khochu tebe skazat (1985)
Artistka iz Gribova (1988)
Zabytaya melodiya dlya fleyty (1988)
Lyubov s privilegiyami (1989)
A vot i ya (1993)
Vorovka (1995)
Moskovskiye kanikuly (1995)
Igra voobrazheniya (1995)
The Irony of Fate 2 (2007)

Plays
Sosluzhivtsy
Pochti smeshnaya istoriya
Amoral'naya istoriya
Igra voobrazheniya

References

External links

1921 births
1998 deaths
Writers from Moscow
Jewish Russian writers
Soviet screenwriters
Male screenwriters
Soviet dramatists and playwrights
Soviet male writers
20th-century Russian male writers
Russian male dramatists and playwrights
Recipients of the USSR State Prize
Recipients of the Vasilyev Brothers State Prize of the RSFSR
Burials at Vagankovo Cemetery
20th-century Russian screenwriters
Kutafin Moscow State Law University alumni